Rafael Montoro y Valdés (1852–1933) was a Spanish politician, lawyer, historian, writer and literary critic.

Spanish politicians
Cuban politicians
1852 births
1933 deaths